The Traveller's Rest is a hotel and public house in Grasmere, Cumbria, England. Located on the eastern side of the A591, it is a Grade II listed building dating to the 16th century.

An old coaching inn at the foot of Dunmail Raise, the building is two storeys, roughcast over stone rubble with a slate roof. It is in two blocks, stepped down the hillside. The upper block has four 16-paned sash windows on the ground floor and two 12-paned sashes above. The lower block has two doors with modern porches, six sashes on the ground floor and five above, mostly 16-paned.

As of 2010, the pub was owned by the Jennings Brewery.

Gallery

References

External links

Grasmere (village)
Coaching inns
Hotels in Cumbria
Grade II listed pubs in Cumbria
16th-century establishments in England